Ahmad Matlub was Professor of Rhetoric and Criticism, President of the Iraqi Scientific Academy, and Minister of Culture and Guidance in the Republic of Iraq in 1967 AD. Ahmed was born on Sunday, Sha'ban 10, 1355 AH / October 25, 1936 AD, in the village of Al-Awja, south of Tikrit, Iraq. He died at 5:15 p.m. on Saturday, 8 Dhul Qi'dah 1439 AH / July 21, 2018.

Education 
He studied elementary and middle school in Tikrit (1941-1950), then he studied secondary school in Karbala and completed it in Karkh, Baghdad. He obtained a Bachelor's degree in Arabic from the College of Arts and Sciences in Baghdad (Department of Arabic Language) with distinction in 1956. He was the first in all departments of the college. Then he obtained a master's degree in rhetoric and criticism with an excellent degree from Cairo University in 1961, then a doctorate in rhetoric and criticism with first honors from Cairo University in 1963.

Career life 
• Ahmed worked as a teacher at Kirkuk High School in 1957, AD

• He moved to work as a teacher in the middle school of commerce in Baghdad 57-1958.

• He worked at the College of Arts at the University of Baghdad since 1958 as a teaching assistant, teacher, assistant professor, associate professor, and then professor.

• Became Director General of Press and Guidance in the Ministry of Culture and Guidance in 1964

• Worked as Director-General of Culture in the same ministry in 1964 AD

• Worked as Head of the Media Department at the University of Baghdad from 1966-to 1969.

• In 1967, Dr. Ahmed Matlab became the Minister of Culture and Guidance in the Republic of Iraq. Then he joined Kuwait University as a delegate professor in 1971 - 1978 AD. He worked as a visiting professor at the Institute of Arab Research and Studies in Cairo, Martin Luther University in German democracy, and Oran University in Algeria.

• Became Dean of the College of Arts at the University of Baghdad from 1984 to 1986 AD

• Became Secretary-General of the Higher Commission for the Care of the Arabic Language in Iraq from 1986 to 2003

• In 2007, he held the position of President of the Iraqi Scientific Academy, which is considered the highest scientific body in Iraq, and a member of the Jordanian Arabic Language Academy and the Jordanian Academy.

Awards 
He was awarded the King Faisal International Prize in the Arabic Language and Literature Branch at a ceremony held in Riyadh. This award was shared equally with Professor Muhammad Rashad Muhammad Al-Saleh Hamzawy (the Tunisian), Professor of Arabic Language and Head of the Arabic Language Department at the College of Arts at Sultan Qaboos University, for the year 1428 AH.

Works 
Has published 37 books on rhetoric, criticism, literature, dictionaries, and Arabization. Moreover, 15 verified books of heritage books on poetry and the eloquence of the Noble Qur'an. More than 60 scientific papers have been published in linguistics, criticism, language, the sciences of the Qur'an, interpretation, hadith, and the Arabization of science and scientific terminology. Such as:

 1981: Rhetorical methods: eloquence - rhetoric - meanings.
 Sculpture in the Arabic language: study and glossary.
 1983: Arabic numerals.
 A Dictionary of Arab Criticism Terms.
 Dictionary of clothes in Lisan Al Arab.
 A dictionary of rhetorical terms and their development.
 Diwan Al-Jin Al-Homsi. In partnership with Abdullah Al-Jiuri.
 A masterpiece of what is strange in the Qur'an.
 A Dictionary of Ratio by Alif and Nun.
 Abdul Qaher Al-Jerjani.
 1982: Rhetorical research among Arabs. (Published in the Small Encyclopedia, Issue: 116).
 1980: Arabic Rhetoric: Meanings, Statem/nt, and Badi.
 1981: The rhetoric of Al-Jahiz.
 1982: Rhetoric and application.
 1980: Al-Qazwini and summary explanations.
 2015: Rafiqa Omari, Central Diyala University Press.
 2020: In Rehab Al-Qalam (a book in several parts).

References 

1936 births 
2018 deaths
Iraqi writers
People from Saladin Governorate